"Mercy Mercy Me (The Ecology)" is the second single from Marvin Gaye's 1971 album, What's Going On. Following the breakthrough of the title track's success, the song, written solely by Gaye, became regarded as one of popular music's most poignant anthems of sorrow regarding the environment. Led by Gaye playing piano, strings conducted by Paul Riser and David Van De Pitte, multi-tracking vocals from Gaye and The Andantes, multiple background instruments provided by The Funk Brothers and a leading sax solo by Wild Bill Moore, the song rose to number 4 on Billboard's Pop Singles chart and number one for two weeks on the R&B Singles charts on August 14 through to August 27, 1971. The distinctive percussive sound heard on the track was a wood block struck by a rubber mallet, drenched in studio reverb. The song also brought Gaye one of his rare appearances on the Adult Contemporary chart, where it peaked at number 34. In Canada, "Mercy Mercy Me" spent two weeks at number 9.

Cash Box described the song as being "a similar chugging ballad effort" to "What's Going On," stating that "the easy going surface lies gently above an exciting rhythm track."

In 1991, a music video of the song was released by Motown Records, featuring appearances by celebrities such as Big Daddy Kane, Bobby Brown, Diana Ross, David Bowie and Wesley Snipes.

As the single became his second million-seller from What's Going On, the album started on the soul album charts in the top five and began charging up the pop rankings. "Mercy Mercy Me (The Ecology)" soon became one of Gaye's most famous songs in his extensive catalogue. In 2002 it was his third single recording to win a "Grammy Hall of Fame" Award. As on "Inner City Blues", Bob Babbitt, not James Jamerson, plays the bass line.

B-side
The B-side, "Sad Tomorrows", was the early version of "Flying High". This song featured on the 40th-anniversary edition of the album. Lyrically, the songs are both the same except "Sad Tomorrows" is a quick two-minute snippet.

Personnel
Marvin Gaye – lead and background vocals, piano, Mellotron
The Andantes – additional background (harmony) vocals
Wild Bill Moore  – tenor saxophone solo
David Van De Pitte – string conduction
The Funk Brothers – other instrumentation

Cover versions
 In December 1990, Robert Palmer combined the song in a medley with Gaye's 1976 hit "I Want You". Palmer's single reached number 16 on the Billboard Hot 100 and number 4 on the Adult Contemporary chart in early 1991. It also hit number 9 on the UK Singles Chart.
In 2006, The Strokes released a cover of the song as the B-side to their "You Only Live Once" single. The cover featured Josh Homme of Queens of the Stone Age on drums alongside Fabrizio Moretti, and vocals from Pearl Jam's Eddie Vedder.
In 2021, R&B singer Lucky Daye covered the song exclusively for Spotify.

References

Source: Spotify

1971 singles
1991 singles
Boyz II Men songs
Environmental songs
Grammy Hall of Fame Award recipients
Marvin Gaye songs
Tamla Records singles
Robert Palmer (singer) songs
Songs written by Marvin Gaye
Song recordings produced by Marvin Gaye
1971 songs